The depressor anguli oris muscle (triangularis muscle) is a facial muscle. It originates from the mandible and inserts into the angle of the mouth. It is associated with frowning, as it depresses the corner of the mouth.

Structure 
The depressor anguli oris arises from the lateral surface of the mandible. Its fibres then converge. It is inserted by a narrow fasciculus into the angle of the mouth. At its origin, it is continuous with the platysma muscle, and at its insertion with the orbicularis oris muscle and risorius muscle. Some of its fibers are directly continuous with those of the levator anguli oris muscle, and others are occasionally found crossing from the muscle of one side to that of the other; these latter fibers constitute the transverse muscle of the chin.

The depressor anguli oris muscle receives its blood supply from a branch of the facial artery.

Nerve supply 
The depressor anguli oris muscle is supplied by the marginal mandibular branch of the facial nerve.

Function 
The depressor anguli oris muscle is a muscle of facial expression. It depresses the corner of the mouth, which is associated with frowning.

Clinical significance

Paralysis 
Damage to the marginal mandibular branch of the facial nerve may cause paralysis of the depressor anguli oris muscle. This may contribute to an asymmetrical smile. This may be corrected by resecting (cutting and removing) the depressor labii inferioris muscle, which has a more significant impact on smiling.

Hypoplasia/Aplasia
Underdevelopment (Hypoplasia) or complete absence (Aplasia) of the depressor anguli oris can occur. Similarly to paralysis, individuals with these conditions will have an asymmetric smile. These conditions are rare, and develop at or before birth (congenitally).

See also 
 Facial muscles
 Transverse muscle of the chin

Additional images

References

External links 

 PTCentral

Muscles of the head and neck
Facial muscles